The 1979 Ondo State gubernatorial election occurred on July 28, 1979. UPN candidate Michael Adekunle Ajasin won the election.

Results
Michael Adekunle Ajasin representing UPN won the election. The election held on July 28, 1979.

References 

Ondo State gubernatorial elections
Ondo State gubernatorial election
Ondo State gubernatorial election